Roblin is a provincial electoral division in Manitoba, Canada. Its current incarnation has existed since the 2019 Manitoba general election in Winnipeg's west end. A previous incarnation of the riding existed from 1914 to 1981 and was located in Western Manitoba.

The first Roblin riding was created by redistribution in 1914 from parts of Russell and Swan River, eliminated by redistribution in 1979, and formally ceased to exist with the 1981 provincial election.

Roblin was located in the province's mid-northwestern region.  After its dissolution, most of its territory was incorporated into the new division of Roblin-Russell, with parts also going to Swan River and Dauphin.  In 1999, the region was further redistributed as Dauphin—Roblin.

Following the 2018 redistribution, a new riding of Roblin was created in Winnipeg that was first used in the 2019 Manitoba general election. The riding replaced Charleswood and contained a part of Morris as well.

Provincial representatives

Election results

References

Manitoba provincial electoral districts